The Antrea Net is one of the oldest known fishing nets in the world, found from Karelian isthmus in Antrea, in Korpilahti village in 1913. It is dated to 8540 BCE. 

The net was found by farmer Antti Virolainen in Antrea, Finland (today Kamennogorsk, Russia) in autumn of 1913 at his home farm Ämmä-Mattila. While he was ditching a swamp meadow, he found several stone and bone objects which got his attention. The site was excavated by the Finnish archaeologist Sakari Pälsi in July 1914. In his excavation, Pälsi found 18 bobbers and 31 net weights and parts of the net. He also found several stone and bone objects, some birchbark and pieces of tinder fungus. All the items were found in a relatively small area, and they had likely come to the scene at the same time in one piece. The items were sunk to the bottom clay of the Ancylus Lake that existed during that period, most likely in an accident that made the fisherman's boat capsize and caused him to lose all his equipment.

The net is made out of willow and it is estimated -- based on the number of parts found -- to have been ca. 27 to 30 metres long by 1.3-1.5 metres wide, with a 6 cm mesh. The size of the mesh is suitable for fishing salmon and common bream. The net is laced with a knot called Ryssänsolmu, which has been in use until much later dates in Estonia and areas of Baltic Finns.

References

Additional sources 
 Miettinen, Arto, Kaarina Sarmaja-Korjonen, Eloni Sonninen, Högne Junger, Terttu Lempiäinen, Kirsi Ylikoski, Jari-Pekka Mäkiaho, Christian Carpelan & Högne Jungner. (2008) The palaeoenvironment of the Antrea Net Find Iskos 16, 71-87, (Journal of the Finnish Antiquarian Society).

1913 archaeological discoveries
Archaeological discoveries in Finland
Archaeological discoveries in Europe
History of the Karelian Isthmus
History of fishing
Prehistoric sites in Russia